Louie Teran is an American mastering engineer and educator. He has worked on recordings for over 200 independent and major record labels artists and soundtracks, most notably, Danny Elfman, Hanz Zimmer and Thirty Seconds to Mars.  He is currently one of the mastering engineers at Marcussen Mastering, owned by Chief Mastering Engineer Stephen Marcussen, in Hollywood, California.

Discography

As an Educator 
Louie has worked at the acclaimed Long Beach City College Commercial Music Program as an adjunct professor teaching mastering and engineering classes.

References

American audio engineers
Mastering engineers